Anne Sutherland (March 1, 1867 – June 22, 1942) was an American stage and screen actress who began acting in the 1880s. She began as a juvenile playing in a HMS Pinafore production. She appeared on stage in the 1880s-1890s with many greats of the period such as Henry E. Dixey in Adonis (1883), Lydia Thompson in Oxygen (1886), Nat C. Goodwin in The Nominee (1891), Georgia Cayvan in The City of Pleasure (1896), Joseph Jefferson in Rip Van Winkle and Mrs. Leslie Carter in Zaza (1899). One of her outstanding later plays was Craig's Wife (1925) which costarred Chrystal Herne.

She was variously known as Annie Sutherland, Ann B. Sutherland and Anne Sutherland at different points in her career.

Family
She was married to actor/singer Richard Field Carroll (1865-1925), aka Richard F. Carroll, and had a daughter Anne Carroll who died in her teens. She was later married to Charles Harding.

Selected filmography
The Kreutzer Sonata (1915)
A Woman's Resurrection (1915)
Motherhood (1917)
The Debt (1917)
God's Crucible (1921)
My Sin (1931)
It Happened in Paris (1932)

References

External links

 Anne Sutherland at IMDb.com
Anne Sutherland at IBDb.com
 Anne in 1912(University of Washington, Sayre collection)
 Google readout of some Annie Sutherland cigarette cards at wikicommons
a scene from Craig's Wife
portrait(Univ. of S. Carolina)

1867 births
1942 deaths
Actresses from Washington, D.C.
American stage actresses